Christina Victoria Grimmie (March 12, 1994 – June 10, 2016) was an American singer and YouTuber. In 2009, she began posting covers of popular songs onto YouTube. After releasing her debut EP, Find Me (2011), her YouTube channel reached one million subscribers. After she reached two million subscribers, she released her debut studio album, With Love (2013).

Grimmie then became a contestant on season six of The Voice, finishing in third place. Adam Levine, her coach on the show, announced in the finale that, regardless of the results, he would sign her to his label 222 Records. Lil Wayne also offered to sign her to his label, Young Money Entertainment. She was signed with Island Records for a short time before being dropped.

Grimmie released her second EP, Side A, in 2016. That same year, she took on an acting role, making her first and only motion picture appearance in The Matchbreaker. On June 10, 2016, Grimmie was fatally shot while signing autographs following a concert performance at The Plaza Live in Orlando, Florida.

Side B, a follow up to Side A, was made available on Spotify and iTunes in 2017, and in June 2017, Grimmie's second and final album, All Is Vanity, was released posthumously. In 2019, her YouTube channel reached four million subscribers, although it dropped below four million in 2020.

Life and career

1994–2009: Childhood 
Christina Victoria Grimmie was born to Tina (nee Milos; 1959 - 2018) and Albert Grimmie (1958)in the Marlton section of Evesham Township, New Jersey, on March 12, 1994. Her mother worked as a receptionist until she was diagnosed with breast cancer; her father worked at Verizon Communications . She had an older brother, Marcus (who served as Christina's road manager during her performances). Grimmie was of Italian and Romanian descent and grew up in Marlton, New Jersey, where she attended Bethel Baptist Christian School, Marlton Middle School, and Cherokee High School. Her father noticed Grimmie's talent for singing when she was six years old, and she started playing the piano at age 10. Despite having received piano lessons, Grimmie said she played by ear.

2009–2010: YouTube recognition and discovery 
Grimmie began posting videos to her YouTube channel in 2009 at age 15, under the username of zeldaxlove64. Grimmie stated that she began a musical YouTube channel so that people could connect with her music, and because her friend persuaded her to post her videos on the popular video-sharing website. The first video she uploaded was a cover of Hannah Montana's "Don't Wanna Be Torn". She first earned recognition for her cover of Miley Cyrus's "Party in the U.S.A." in August 2009. Grimmie's covers first gained attention and stood out due to her voice, personality, and interpretations of well-known songs.

Grimmie was homeschooled for her junior year of high school in 2010. That same year, she covered Nelly's "Just a Dream" with fellow YouTubers Sam Tsui and Kurt Hugo Schneider in a video which received more than 190 million views over the course of ten years. Later, it also became available on iTunes and Spotify. In 2011, she placed No. 2 in the MyYouTube competition, behind Selena Gomez. As her popularity grew on YouTube, Grimmie was discovered in 2011 by Gomez's mother, Mandy Teefey; Teefey and her husband Brian soon became Grimmie's managers.

2011: Find Me 

Grimmie performed in the UNICEF charity concert, and also performed backup vocals for Selena Gomez & the Scene; she appeared on the first DigiTour in 2011, which was created specifically for YouTube artists. Gomez became her mentor. Grimmie appeared on the Billboard Social 50; she also opened for Selena Gomez & the Scene, Allstar Weekend and the Jonas Brothers during the Concert of Hope. She toured for six weeks with Selena Gomez & the Scene opening for them in the We Own the Night Tour.

She released an EP entitled Find Me, on June 14, 2011. The album was released independently and debuted at number 35 on the Billboard 200 chart in the US. Her debut single "Advice" was released to Radio Disney on June 11, with the music video, directed by Sean Babas, being released on July 19 on her YouTube channel. She appeared on The Ellen DeGeneres Show with fellow YouTuber Tyler Ward, performing a cover to Lil Wayne's "How to Love"; the episode aired on October 10, 2011.

On November 20, 2011, Grimmie performed at the 39th American Music Awards of 2011 pre-show alongside Taio Cruz to a special rendition of "Higher" and also won her first award. She also performed her song "Not Fragile" at the Coca-Cola Red Carpet Show along with Selena Gomez & the Scene. She and the band then appeared together in a commercial for Xbox's Kinect. Grimmie also appeared in a commercial for Doritos that same month. Grimmie was the special musical guest performing her hit song "Advice" on Disney Channel's So Random!, which premiered on December 11, 2011.

2012–2013: With Love 
In January 2012, Grimmie moved to Los Angeles to pursue her singing career; she was signed in April to Creative Artists Agency. On Disney.com, she starred in the web show Power Up: with Christina Grimmie, which ran from March 29, 2012, until June 5, 2012. She also revealed that she would be working with a new band, Rising Tide, a teen group originally from her hometown area in New Jersey. A stripped version of Grimmie's original song "Find Me" was released on ITunes in June 2012, and reached the front page later in July. Though Grimmie's channel mostly focused on covers and original music, she also started pursuing other interests. By April 2013, Grimmie's channel had more than 375 million views and two million subscribers. She then opened for Gomez during the North American leg of her Stars Dance Tour, performing songs from her debut album With Love, which was released on August 6, 2013. On October 3, her music video for "Tell My Mama" was given its exclusive premiere on Billboard.com. Grimmie said the video is "about a guy that I start liking in school, and he's sort of a dangerous kid, and I am the type of girl that tells my mom about everything." In January 2014, Grimmie appeared on an episode of the podcast Shane and Friends; Dawson was a friend of Grimmie's.

2014: The Voice 
Grimmie auditioned for season 6 of NBC's singing competition, The Voice, as revealed on her Facebook page. During the Blind Auditions, she performed Miley Cyrus's hit song "Wrecking Ball". All four coaches, Adam Levine, Usher, Shakira, and Blake Shelton, "turned their chairs" for her. She opted for Adam Levine after he told her that she had the potential to be a "huge star" due to her voice and stage presence. Selena Gomez supported Grimmie during her audition, and Justin Bieber, an artist Grimmie had frequently covered on YouTube, supported her during the finale. She finished in 3rd place, behind winner Josh Kaufman and runner-up Jake Worthington. Host Carson Daly later said he was "shocked" Grimmie did not win. All of Grimmie's performances were released on iTunes and Spotify as studio versions.

 – Studio version of performance reached the top 10 on iTunes

2014–2016: Post-The Voice and major label debut 

During the competition, Grimmie's coach Adam expressed his desire to sign her to his record label, 222 Records; Lil Wayne also showed interest in signing her to Young Money Entertainment. She ultimately chose to sign with Island Records. She toured with previous contestants of The Voice, including season 5 winner Tessanne Chin, runner-up Jacquie Lee, Will Champlin, season 1 runner-up Dia Frampton, season 6 winner Josh Kaufman, runner-up Jake Worthington, and fellow season 6 contestants Kristen Merlin and Jake Barker. The Voice Summer tour started on June 21, 2014, in San Antonio, Texas. She was writing and recording music for her sophomore album, her third major release, and first release since being signed to a label. The lead single was expected to be released in July 2014, with the album following later in the year. Grimmie announced via Facebook that filming for the lyric video for the single started on July 6, 2014.

On July 11, she announced that her new single would be called "Must Be Love". On July 15, 2014, she announced via a live stream that the song would be released on July 31. "Must Be Love" was produced by Elof Loelv and recorded at ZAC Recording in Atlanta, Georgia.

In February 2015, Grimmie collaborated with Dove Cameron and made a music video for "What A Girl Is", an original song from Cameron's show Liv and Maddie. The music video was released on Grimmie's channel and Disney's YouTube channel. It was also promoted on the official channel. On March 4, 2015, Grimmie announced that she had been dropped from Island Records and that she was working on a new album set to be released in late 2015. The new single from the album, "Cliché", was released on March 16, 2015. On April 27, Grimmie released her second single, "Stay with Me", a collaboration with Diamond Eyes, which climbed to No. 5 on the iTunes Electronic Charts. The song also was included on 2015 UKF Dubstep, an album showcasing the top dubstep songs of the year. She was a contestant in the iHeartRadio/Macy's Rising Star Contest. On May 27, 2015, Grimmie was revealed as the winner of the contest, securing her spot to open the 2015 iHeartRadio Music Festival in September.

On July 2, 2015, she released her third single, "Shrug". In September 2015, she was one of 16 international artists, including Paul McCartney, to record the charity single "Love Song to the Earth", which raises climate change awareness. Grimmie returned to The Voice for season 9, to promote Kohl's fashion.

On February 21, 2016, Grimmie released her second EP, titled Side A, which consisted of four songs. Grimmie said Side B was likely to follow. She had hoped to release a second full-length album by the end of the year.

2016–2022: Posthumous releases 
Grimmie had made a four-part video series for Side A comprising "The Ballad of Jessica Blue"; in July 2016, Brian Teefey announced that the videos would debut via Billboard then be featured on her YouTube channel. The first video, for the song "Snow White", debuted on August 11. The second video, for "Anybody's You", debuted on August 18. "Deception" debuted on August 25; "Without Him" on September 1.

Grimmie made her motion picture acting debut in The Matchbreaker, directed by Caleb Vetter. The film was released in selected theaters in October 2016 and released digitally in December.

Grimmie received her only Teen Choice Award in 2016, winning posthumously for Choice Web Star: Music. It was her third such nomination. The televised ceremony caused backlash among her fans, who said her name was used to promote the show, but never mentioned during the broadcast despite the inclusion of a tribute to victims of gun violence. Her fans also called out the Emmys for excluding Grimmie from their memoriam.

On February 17, 2017, Grimmie's family released the posthumous single "Invisible". "Invisible" is part of Grimmie's EP Side B, which was released on April 21, 2017. Following the release of Side B, Grimmie's first posthumous album, All Is Vanity, was released on June 9, 2017. On May 11, 2018, Grimmie's family released another single, "Little Girl", which Grimmie wrote and recorded to support her mother as she battled breast cancer. On September 15, 2020, Grimmie's family released her original song "Cry Wolf". In 2021, Grimmie's family released her original song "Back to Life", along with 3 remixes.

In 2022, "Rule the World" completed as a duet with vocals by Ryan Brown was released.

Artistry

Voice and influences
Grimmie was a light-lyric soprano, with a range spanning three octaves and three notes. In 2014, while on The Voice, Usher called her a "baby Céline Dion". Graham Nash said, "I'm amazed at the range and the control and the depth of her voice. At 20 years old? That's insane." Shakira deemed her high register "out of this world."

Grimmie grew up listening to contemporary Christian artist Stacie Orrico: "She has a really awesome voice and I was so drawn to it. I think the reason I do have a soul voice is because I grew up listening to her and she was my huge, huge influence. I wanted to sound just like her, I wrote songs that kinda sounded like something she would do." Grimmie cited Christina Aguilera as her main influence vocally, and listed her favorite singers as Celine Dion, Whitney Houston, and Lady Gaga. She also said she admired Beyoncé for her vocals. She said she liked dubstep and DJ music, as well as rock 'n roll and heavy metal artists Metallica, Pantera, Iron Maiden, and Tool.

Personal life and activism 
Grimmie was a Christian. Her family attended Fellowship Alliance Chapel in Medford, New Jersey, before they moved to Los Angeles. Grimmie had cited her mother, a three-time breast cancer survivor, as a major inspiration for her musical career. On September 2, 2018, Grimmie's mother Tina Grimmie died at the age of 59 after a "courageous and brave battle with breast cancer".

Grimmie was an animal rights activist and participated in fundraising events for the Humane Society of the United States. The Christina Grimmie Animal Medical Fund was created in her honor, and she posthumously won the "Impact Award" from the industry for her animal rights activism. She also worked with PETA to promote pet adoption, after adopting a dog in 2014. In her honor, she received a leaf on PETA's Tree of Life, which honors heroes for animals. Grimmie was an anime fan, and had a Twitch channel where she frequently streamed.

Murder

On June 10, 2016, Grimmie performed with Before You Exit at The Plaza Live in Orlando, Florida. Earlier in the day, she posted an announcement on social media asking people to attend the concert. After her performance ended at 10:00 p.m. local time, Grimmie signed autographs inside the venue. At 10:24 p.m., she was shot by 27-year-old Kevin James Loibl after initially opening her arms to give him a hug. As witnesses fled the scene, Loibl was tackled by Grimmie's brother, and the men scuffled. Loibl broke free, backed against a wall, and fatally shot himself.

Grimmie was on the floor and bleeding from the head; after CPR was performed on her, 9-1-1 was called and she was taken to the Orlando Regional Medical Center in critical condition with gunshot wounds; she was pronounced dead just before 11:00 p.m. local time. An autopsy was performed the following day, on June 11, which concluded that Grimmie had been shot three times: once in the head and twice in the chest. Her official cause of death was "gunshot wounds of head and chest".

The Orlando Police Department said Loibl had traveled by taxi to Orlando from his home in St. Petersburg, Florida, bringing two handguns, two extra magazines full of ammunition, and a large hunting knife. Orlando Police Chief John Mina stated that "The suspect traveled to Orlando apparently to commit this crime and then had plans to travel back to where he came from." According to Orlando police, the bags of the attendees would normally have been checked, but there were no metal detectors at the venue, nor were the attendees frisked.

One witness complained that the security was concerned about food and beverages being brought into the theater, but did not catch Loibl's guns. Witnesses described Loibl as "nervous" and "kinda creepy".

Loibl had purchased the guns legally. He did not have an arrest record in his home county of Pinellas, but did have previous run-ins with the police. He did not appear to know Grimmie personally; nor did Grimmie know him. He had not had any diagnosis of any mental illnesses, but had a history of violence.

Police did not offer a motive, but said that Loibl had shown an "unhealthy and unrealistic infatuation" with the singer and tried to make himself more physically attractive for her through weight loss, hair plugs, teeth whitening and eye surgery. The Orlando Sentinel described his motive as "If I can't have you, then nobody else can — and I'm going to possess you by taking your life." Although Loibl lived "like a hermit", his family said that they were not aware of his plans to travel to Orlando nor that he possessed any guns. They also stated that they had never heard of Grimmie, heard Loibl talk about her, or watched The Voice. However, his "only friend in the world" claimed to have known about Loibl's obsession, though not its extent; Loibl's co-workers stated the same. They said Loibl would be "angry and defensive" when questioned about his obsession and before the shooting had stated he was "tired and ready to ascend".

On June 16, Grimmie was buried at Berlin Cemetery in a private ceremony. The following day, thousands of friends and fans attended a public memorial held in Medford, New Jersey.

Aftermath and reactions
Dozens of artists and other celebrities took to social media in response to Grimmie's death. The Voice tweeted, "There are no words. We lost a beautiful soul with an amazing voice". Her former coach, Adam Levine, wrote that he and his wife were "absolutely devastated and heartbroken... This is yet another senseless act of extreme violence." Blake Shelton wrote "I'm stunned and disgusted and heartbroken that we lost that sweet little girl." Longtime friend and former tour-mate Selena Gomez was performing only a few miles away from Grimmie at the Amway Center when she was shot. The following morning she wrote, "My heart is absolutely broken. I miss you, Christina." Gomez also tearfully dedicated her performance of Hillsong's "Transfiguration" to Grimmie's memory at her Miami concert the following night on June 11, and then canceled a meet-and-greet scheduled to take place that night, citing fear and grief. Gomez later checked into rehab and put her tour on hold.

Many others dedicated performances to Grimmie, such as Justin Bieber, Sabrina Carpenter, Demi Lovato, Maroon 5, Twenty One Pilots, Charlie Puth, and Rachel Platten. Dove Cameron, who had previously collaborated with Grimmie, expressed her grief over the course of a few days on Twitter. Before You Exit, with whom Grimmie had performed before the shooting, tweeted, "Today we lost an angel, sister, and a beloved friend."

The family of the perpetrator of Grimmie's death left a handwritten note on their doorstep offering their condolences and apologies for their son's actions, with "no other comments". Susan Wojcicki, the CEO of YouTube, paid tribute by saying the YouTube family was "heartbroken" and "shocked" to hear of Grimmie's murder, with YouTube officially paying tribute on their website.

Many YouTubers made tribute videos for Grimmie, and on June 17, a montage of clips featuring Grimmie titled "In Loving Memory Of Christina Grimmie" was posted on her official YouTube channel, which gained upwards of 2.5 million views and 33,000 comments in the first four days. Songs written and recorded in Grimmie's memory include Tyler Ward's "A Song for Christina", Before You Exit's "Clouds", MAX's "Christina's Song", "Somebody's Angel" by Jacquie Lee, and "Blink of an Eye" by Tori Kelly. In Season 11 of The Voice, the coaches performed "Dream On" at the start of the show, as a tribute to Grimmie. In Season 12, Team Adam performed "Hey Jude" as another tribute to Grimmie; her family was in the audience.

On June 11, a GoFundMe was created by Grimmie's manager to cover funeral costs and expenses for the Grimmie family, raising over $170,000 in two days and surpassing its goal of $4,000. It received over 25,000 shares through social media; however, soon after, Adam Levine offered to pay for all expenses. Also, a petition was created on change.org to honor Grimmie, a fan of the video game series The Legend of Zelda, by naming a non-playable character after her in the upcoming Legend of Zelda game set to be released in 2017. It was signed by over 70,000 people, including her brother Marcus, though nothing ever came of it. Grimmie was scheduled to appear at E3 2016; the president of Nintendo of America, Reggie Fils-Aimé, gave his condolences to Grimmie and the victims of the Orlando nightclub shooting before giving his Nintendo E3 2016 speech on announcing The Legend of Zelda: Breath of the Wild.

Grimmie's death led to calls for increased security at performing arts venues, and also created a discussion about gun control and mental health. American heavy metal band Pantera, noting the similarities between Grimmie's murder and the deaths of former Pantera guitarist Darrell Abbott and three others in 2004, urged concert promoters and club owners to impose stronger measures to protect artists from "gun-wielding fanatics", adding: "Sadly, that's not the case and another rising star had to pay the consequences with her life."

The Plaza Live reopened four days after the shooting, paying tribute to Grimmie. Management asked Orlando police to help evaluate the club's security. Some singers in Las Vegas—including Cali Tucker, another season six contestant on The Voice—were given escorts after their performances. In California, VidCon added metal detectors and security officers, and banned informal meet-and-greets in the wake of Grimmie's shooting. Video personalities including Joey Graceffa were assigned private security. An industry attorney said the extra measures are "expensive, and fans don't like it. But this is the new reality."

The shooting at Pulse nightclub bar occurred the night after Grimmie's murder, and also took place in Orlando; it was only four miles from where Grimmie was shot. While police confirmed that the two shootings had no connection, Billboard published "An Open Letter to Congress: Stop Gun Violence Now" on June 23, demanding background checks for every gun purchase and an outright ban on sales to suspected terrorists. The inspiration for the letter came from both shootings, and Billboard editors said the ease with which "dangerous people" can get guns is the one connection between Grimmie's murder and the Pulse shooting. The letter was signed by nearly 200 music industry luminaries, including artists Cher, Jennifer Lopez, Lady Gaga, Britney Spears, Thom Yorke, surviving Beatles Paul McCartney and Ringo Starr, and executives Daniel Glass, Irving Azoff, and Russell Simmons.

In February 2017, Grimmie's family announced their plans to create a foundation in her honor named "The Christina Grimmie Foundation". The foundation's purpose is to support those affected by gun violence and/or breast cancer. The foundation frequently hosts events in Grimmie's honor, to ensure that Grimmie's death is "not the end of her story." Later that month, an episode of 48 Hours titled "Stalked" aired, focusing on Grimmie's murder.

On the second anniversary of Grimmie's murder, the city of Orlando paid tribute, as did the police force. That same month, a podcast titled Christina Grimmie: The Murder of a Rising Star was released, with separate episodes all focusing on key components of her murder. After the Jacksonville Landing shooting occurred in August 2018, BBC News compared Grimmie's murder with it, along with other shootings that had occurred in Florida.

Lawsuit
In December 2016, six months after her murder, Grimmie's family filed a wrongful-death lawsuit against several entities, including the concert promoter, the foundation that owns the venue, and the security company working the event. In January 2017, the promoter and the owner of the venue requested that the judge dismiss the lawsuit, claiming Florida law does not allow business owners to be held liable for attacks on their property. A hearing on the motion to dismiss the lawsuit was set for May 23. The lawsuit was dismissed but Grimmie's family was given an opportunity to re-file the suit. The judge stated that the suit did not make enough of a distinction between the concert promoter and the venue owner.

In May 2017, the family's attorney, Brian Caplan, said that Grimmie's family would file a new complaint after a Florida judge dismissed the original lawsuit.

On April 9, 2018, just short of a year after the Grimmie family filed a new complaint in a Florida court, it was revealed that a judge rejected the defendants' AEG Live and the Orlando Philharmonic Orchestra Plaza Foundation motions to dismiss the case, and allowed the family's lawsuit to move forward. In their lawsuit, the Grimmie family alleged that the defendants had "failed to take adequate security measures to ensure the safety of the performers and the attendees at the concert venue." Grimmie's family was also allowed to move forward on claims of "negligent infliction of emotional distress". The judge determined more research on the claims would be needed before going forward. According to court records, on December 3, 2019, Grimmie's family voluntarily dismissed the case.

Filmography

Television

Film

Discography

Studio albums

Compilation albums

EPs

Singles

Music videos

Awards and nominations

Concert tours 
Opening acts
 Selena Gomez & the Scene – A Year Without Rain Tour (2010-2011)
 DigiTour – Lancaster PA, Washington D.C., New York NY (2011)
 Selena Gomez & the Scene – We Own the Night Tour (2011)
 Selena Gomez – Stars Dance Tour (2013)
 IHeartRadio Music Festival – Las Vegas, NV (2015)
 Rachel Platten – The Wildfire Tour (2016)
 Before You Exit – All The Lights Tour (2016)

 Public tours
 The Voice – Summer Tour (2014)
 Before You Exit – January and February UK/Europe Tour (2015)

See also 

 Dimebag Darrell
 Murder of John Lennon
 Murder of Selena
 Rebecca Schaeffer

Explanatory notes

Citations

General and cited references

External links 

 
 
 
 

1994 births
2016 deaths
2016 murders in the United States
21st-century American actresses
21st-century American singers
21st-century American women singers
21st-century Christians
21st-century pianists
American child singers
American Christians
American murder victims
American people of Italian descent
American people of Romanian descent
American sopranos
American women singer-songwriters
American YouTubers
Burials in New Jersey
Cherokee High School (New Jersey) alumni
Deaths by firearm in Florida
Female murder victims
Island Records artists
Murder–suicides in Florida
Music YouTubers
Participants in American reality television series
People from Evesham Township, New Jersey
People murdered in Florida
Republic Records artists
Singer-songwriters from New Jersey
The Voice (franchise) contestants
Universal Music Group artists
YouTube channels launched in 2009
21st-century women pianists